"Living Is a Problem Because Everything Dies" is the opening song on Scottish band Biffy Clyro's fourth album, Puzzle. It was released on 14 May 2007, as the second physical single from the album. The song itself, without any B-sides, was released as a digital download on 7 May 2007.

In the week after its download release, but before its CD release, the single reached number 72 on the UK Singles Chart before peaking at number 19 the week of its release. The same week, the song became the band's second number-one single on the Scottish Singles Chart, after "Saturday Superhouse". The song was the first single released by the band in the United States, and was the first single released there for Puzzle. It was added to the playlists of several radio stations in the United States—including WBRU, WQEX and WHHZ—which allowed the song to reach number 47 on the US Modern Rock Tracks chart.

Overview
Simon Neil has commented on the song, saying:

 He also added that it is "about hitting a low point and not giving a fuck. It was classic depression, I suppose."

The song was first played on BBC Radio 1 by Zane Lowe on 13 March 2007 in The Hottest Record In The World segment. On 29 March, it was announced that the track will be released as a single (instead of "The Conversation Is...", as originally planned), following a "fairly wonderful" reaction to the track when played on Zane Lowe's Radio One show.

Composition
The guitars and bass in "Living is a Problem Because Everything Dies" are in Drop C tuning, which is a notable variation from Biffy Clyro's preferred tuning: Drop D. The track features string and choir arrangements by Hollywood composer Graeme Revell, performed by the Seattle Symphony Orchestra. The band has used string sections before in the songs "With Aplomb" and "Now the Action Is On Fire!" from 2003's The Vertigo of Bliss, but this is the first time the band has worked with an orchestra. The orchestra is also featured on the track "9/15ths". The arrangement was written by the band themselves.

Track listings
Songs and lyrics by Simon Neil. Music by Biffy Clyro.
 CD 14FLR21CD
 "Living Is a Problem Because Everything Dies (Radio Edit)" – 3:33
 "Relief Or Fight" – 4:09
 7" #1 14FLR21V1
 "Living Is a Problem Because Everything Dies (Radio Edit)" – 3:33
 "Loneliness" – 2:33
 7" #2 14FLR21V2
 "Living Is a Problem Because Everything Dies (Radio Edit)" – 3:33
 "Kittens, Cakes and Cuddles" – 3:34
  Digital download
 "Living Is a Problem Because Everything Dies (Radio Edit)" – 3:33
 iTunes exclusive
 "Living Is a Problem Because Everything Dies (Demo)" - 5:14
 7digital exclusive
 "Living Is a Problem Because Everything Dies (Live at Glasgow Carling Academy on 29 April 2007)"

Personnel
 Simon Neil – guitar, vocals
 Ben Johnston – drums
 James Johnston – bass
 Garth Richardson – producer
 Graeme Revell – string and choir orchestrations
 Seattle Symphony Orchestra – violins, violas, cellos, choir

Charts

References

External links
 "Living is a Problem Because Everything Dies" on Last.fm
 "Living is a Problem Because Everything Dies" Lyrics
 "Living is a Problem Because Everything Dies" Guitar Tablature

Songs about depression
Biffy Clyro songs
2007 singles
Albums with cover art by Storm Thorgerson
Songs written by Simon Neil
Song recordings produced by Garth Richardson
2007 songs
14th Floor Records singles
Number-one singles in Scotland
Music videos directed by Andy Morahan